Gogland or Hogland (transliteration from original) is an island in the Gulf of Finland in the eastern Baltic Sea, about 180 km west from Saint Petersburg and 35 km from the coast of Finland (near Kotka). It belongs to Russia's Kingiseppsky District in the Leningrad Oblast.

Gogland's tourist industry is growing in importance, with most tourists coming from St. Petersburg, and some from Finland. In 2006, however, Russian authorities declared Gogland a "border area", which means that foreign nationals are not allowed to travel to the island without special permits. This limits tourism from abroad to small groups, admitted one at a time, and adds extensive bureaucracy to applications for permission to visit the island.

Name
Different transliterations of the name from the Russian language have been used. In older transliterations, the Russian Г is transliterated as "G", but in contemporary usage, it is rendered as "H". Since being ceded to Russia, the latter form is often used in western languages.

History

Gogland has been inhabited by ethnic Finns since at least the 16th century, but it has changed hands several times. Throughout much of its history the island was part of the Kingdom of Sweden, which controlled Finland; however, after the Great Northern War (as part of which, the action of 22 July 1713 took place near the island), the Russian Empire, under Tsar Peter I, claimed the island. Peter then had the island's first lighthouse built in 1723.

During the Russo-Swedish War (1788–1790) the Battle of Hogland, between the Russian and Swedish fleets, took place offshore, in July 1788.

During the Crimean War, four vessels of the Royal Navy—Arrogant, Cossack, Magicienne, and Ruby—silenced the Russian batteries at a fort on the island, while the Anglo-French fleet went on to attack Sveaborg before returning home.

Offshore there have been several notable shipwrecks. The crew of the three-mast clipper Amerika, which sank near the shore in October 1856, lie buried in an old Finnish cemetery.

After the Finnish War (1808–1809), Gogland officially passed to the Russian Empire, although it was made part of the newly created Grand Duchy of Finland which gained independence from Russia in 1917. Most of the island's population lived in two fishing villages administrated from Viipuri (Vyborg).

Gogland is known as the location of one of the earliest radio contacts, which took place on 6 February 1900 under the supervision of Alexander Popov. (The time and details of this event vary slightly in different sources.)

Tourism became an important source of income in the interbellum. There was also a small soft drink factory on the island.

In March 1939, the Soviets asked Finland to lease Suursaari and four small uninhabited islets for thirty years and cede rich and heavily populated areas on the Karelian isthmus, as they claimed they were vital for the defense of Leningrad, the second biggest Soviet city. In return, the Soviet Union would show its good faith by offering a large slice of empty and unofficially disputed Karelian borderland in exchange. The Finns refused.

Soviet troops occupied the island during the Winter War (1939–1940), and the civilian population was evacuated. Gogland and nearby islands became strategically important during World War II, as German and Finnish forces used them to observe and maintain the massive belts of sea mines that kept the Soviet fleet bottled up in the eastern Gulf of Finland throughout the conflict.

Finnish forces captured Gogland during the Battle of Suursaari (December 1941 – April 1942). Later, in September 1944—Finland having ceased hostilities with the Soviet Union—the Germans attempted to take the island from their Finnish former allies but were repulsed with heavy losses in Operation Tanne Ost. Hogland became a Soviet possession at the end of the war.

In 2019, Russia built a military heliport with room for multiple helicopters and a refueling station on the island.

NATO forces have used the island as a border point for Russia.

Landmarks
During the war years, both Soviet and Finnish troops built extensive fortifications, which are still found all over the island, along with discarded military equipment.

The island has both modern and very old lighthouses.

The log village of Suurkylä (Russian: Суркюля, Surkyulya) has been levelled and replaced with a few modern dwellings, possibly for a Soviet fishing collective farm, as well as some military facilities. Currently, about 50 people live permanently on the island, and the little fishing that still occurs is mainly recreational.

The island is renowned for its rugged scenery, including five lakes. Since 1826, the hill Mäkiinpäällys has two of the points in the Struve Geodetic Arc.

References

External links

 FSB`s order number 239
 Tourist attractions of Gogland
 Account of a trip to Gogland, with illustrations
 Old pictures and maps from the Finnish era

Russian islands in the Baltic
Islands of Leningrad Oblast